Karl Kenneth Singer (born October 12, 1943) is a former American football tackle who played three seasons with the Boston Patriots of the American Football League (AFL). He was drafted by the Boston Patriots in the first round of the 1966 American Football League Draft. He was also drafted by the Cleveland Browns in the 19th round of the 1966 NFL Draft. He played college football at Purdue University and attended Niles McKinley High School in Niles, Ohio.

References

External links
Just Sports Stats

Living people
1943 births
Players of American football from Ohio
American football tackles
Purdue Boilermakers football players
Boston Patriots players
Sportspeople from Warren, Ohio
Niles McKinley High School alumni